Nabis ferus is a species of damsel bug in the family Nabidae. It is found in Central America and Europe.

Subspecies
These two subspecies belong to the species Nabis ferus:
 Nabis ferus ferus
 Nabis ferus pallidipennis Harris

References

Further reading

 

Nabidae
Articles created by Qbugbot
Insects described in 1758
Taxa named by Carl Linnaeus